William R. Roush is an American organic chemist. He was born on February 20, 1952, in Chula Vista, California. Roush studied chemistry at the University of California Los Angeles (B.S. 1974) and Harvard University (Ph.D. 1977 under Robert Burns Woodward). Following a year postdoctoral appointment at Harvard, he joined that faculty at the Massachusetts Institute of Technology. In 1987, Dr. Roush moved to Indiana University and was promoted to Professor in 1989 and Distinguished Professor in 1995. Two years later, he moved to the University of Michigan in Ann Arbor and served as the Warner Lambert/Parke Davis Professor of Chemistry. He served as chair of the University of Michigan's Department of Chemistry from 2002-2004. In 2004 Professor Roush relocated with his group to the Jupiter, Florida, campus of the Scripps Research Institute (TSRI) where he is currently an emeritus professor.

Roush was active in the field of organic chemistry with research interests including natural product synthesis, methods development and medicinal chemistry. He is known for his stereochemical studies and synthetic applications of the intramolecular Diels-Alder reaction and his work in the area of asymmetric and acyclic diastereoselective synthesis, specifically the use of tartrate ester modified allylboronates and other allylmetal compounds for the aldol-like construction of propionate-derived systems. He has also made important contributions the synthesis of deoxyglycosides and polyhydroxylated natural products, and to the design and synthesis of inhibitors of cysteine proteases targeting important human pathogens (e.g., Trypanosoma, Plasmodium and Entamoeba species).

Awards 
William Roush has received numerous awards and honors including:

Phi Beta Kappa, 1974 
Merck Faculty Development Award, 1981 
Eli Lilly Grantee, 1981–83 
Roger and Georges Firmenich Career Development Chair in Natural Products Chemistry (MIT), 1981–84 
Fellow of the Alfred P. Sloan Foundation, 1982–86 
Alan R. Day Award of the Philadelphia Organic Chemist's Club, 1992 
Arthur C. Cope Scholar Award, American Chemical Society, 1994 
ACS Akron Section Award, 1996 
Merit Award, National Institute of General Medical Sciences, 1998 
Distinguished Faculty Achievement Award, University of Michigan, 1998 
Paul G. Gassman Distinguished Service Award - ACS Division of Organic Chemistry, 2002 
ACS Ernest Guenther Award in the Chemistry of Natural Products, 2004 
Fellow, American Association for the Advancement of Science, 2006 
Fellow, American Chemical Society, 2009

References 
 http://www.scripps.edu/research/faculty/roush
 http://www.scripps.edu/newsandviews/i_20041004/roush.html

External links 
 Roush group - scripps.edu

Living people
1952 births
21st-century American chemists
Scripps Research faculty
University of California, Los Angeles alumni
Harvard University alumni
Massachusetts Institute of Technology faculty
Indiana University faculty
University of Michigan faculty
People from Chula Vista, California